(The Tenant) is an opera after the novel The Tenant (Le locataire chimérique) by Roland Topor, with music by Arnulf Herrmann composed in 2012 to 2017. The libretto was written by Händl Klaus. Commissioned by the Oper Frankfurt, the opera was first performed there on 12 November 2017, directed by Johannes Erath and conducted by Kazushi Ōno.

History 
Topor's 1964 novel Der Mieter (Le locataire chimérique) was filmed as The Tenant by Roman Polanski in 1976. Händl Klaus wrote the libretto, commissioned by the Oper Frankfurt. Arnulf Herrmann composed the music between 2012 and 2017. For the leading woman, Johanna, he composed three songs (Gesänge) which were premiered already in 2014, titled Drei Gesänge am offenen Fenster (Three Songs at the Open Window) in the  concert series. Anja Petersen stepped in as the singer and received critical praise.

Reviewer  of the Frankfurter Allgemeine Zeitung saw the danger of rivalry to both the eloquent novel and the film powerful in images, and located the opera between Kafka's The Metamorphosis and Sartre's No Exit.

Roles

Reception 
The Frankfurt premiere was reviewed mostly with acceptance. A reviewer of the Financial Times warned "If you are feeling unstable, stay away.", and summarised that the production made "this a journey to the blackest regions of an anguished psyche in a hostile world". After praising all who made the performance possible, she concluded: 

The Japanese conductor Kazushi Ōno was seen by a reviewer of Die Deutsche Bühne as a highly competent advocate of the multilayered score ("als hochkompetenter Anwalt von Herrmanns vielschichtiger Partitur").  Andreas Bomba of the Frankfurter Neue Presse reported strong applause for an extraordinary ensemble performance for a work described as suggestive, depressing and intense.

The opera was nominated for the Opera Awards 2018.

References

External links 
 ISSUU, score of act I and act II
 Arnulf Herrmann website
 Trailer Oper Frankfurt

Operas
German-language operas
2017 operas
Operas based on novels